Apatelodes paratima is a moth in the family Apatelodidae first described by William Schaus in 1910. It is found in Mexico, Guatemala, Panamá and Costa Rica.

References

External links

Apatelodidae
Moths described in 1910